Tales of the Crown is the thirteenth album by German speed/power metal guitarist Axel Rudi Pell. It released on 24 October 2008 by Steamhammer/SPV records. The album was #56 on the Sweden charts and #81 on the Switzerland charts.

Track listing
All songs by Axel Rudi Pell.
 "Higher" - 7:18
 "Ain't Gonna Win" - 4:52
 "Angel Eyes" - 4:58
 "Crossfire" - 5:22
 "Touching My Soul" - 6:32
 "Emotional Echoes" - 5:07
 "Riding on an Arrow" - 5:55
 "Tales of the Crown" - 8:21
 "Buried Alive" - 5:42
 "Northern Lights" - 6:22

Personnel
Johnny Gioeli - Vocals
Axel Rudi Pell - Guitar
Volker Krawczak - Bass
Mike Terrana - Drums
Ferdy Doernberg - Keyboards

Release history 
Germany / Austria / Switzerland - October 24, 2008
Europe - October 27, 2008
Spain / Portugal / France / UK - November 3
USA - November 4, 2008

External links
 Tales of The Crown review at About.com:Heavy Metal

2008 albums
Axel Rudi Pell albums
SPV/Steamhammer albums